Mir Mahalleh (also Romanized as Mīr Maḩalleh) is a village in Sheykh Neshin Rural District, Shanderman District, Masal County, Gilan Province, Iran.

Population 
At the 2006 census, its population was 450, in 114 families.

References 

Populated places in Masal County